Mikael Andersson may refer to:

Mikael Andersson (footballer, born 1972), Swedish football player
Mikael Andersson (footballer, born 1978), Swedish footballer, played for Sandjeford in the 2006 Norwegian Football Cup Final
Mikael Andersson (ice hockey, born 1959), from  Jukkasjärvi, Sweden, retired ice hockey player
Mikael Andersson (ice hockey, born 1966), from Malmö, Sweden, is a retired ice hockey right winger

See also
Michael Andersson (disambiguation)
Michael Anderson (disambiguation)